Ezekiel Babcock (August 22, 1828 – April 16, 1905) was an American farmer and politician.

Born in Westerlo, New York, Babcock moved to Ceresco, Wisconsin (now Ripon, Wisconsin) in 1852. He was a farmer and served as chairman of the Ripon Town Board. In 1882, Babcock served in the Wisconsin State Assembly and was a Republican.<ref>'Fond du Lac County, Wisconsin Past and Present,' Volume II, Maurice McKenna, S. J. Clarke Publishing Company, Chicago, Illinois: 1912, Biographical Sketch of Fred Babcock (information about his father Ezekiel Babcock is in the biographical sketch), pg. 64-65</ref</ref>

Notes

External links

1828 births
1905 deaths
People from Westerlo, New York
People from Ripon, Wisconsin
Farmers from Wisconsin
Mayors of places in Wisconsin
Republican Party members of the Wisconsin State Assembly
19th-century American politicians